The Paja Formation (K1p, Kip, Kimp, b3b6p) is an Early Cretaceous geologic formation of central Colombia. The formation extends across the northern part of the Altiplano Cundiboyacense, the Western Colombian emerald belt and surrounding areas of the Eastern Ranges of the Colombian Andes. In the subsurface, the formation is found in the Middle Magdalena Valley to the west. The Paja Formation stretches across four departments, from north to south the southernmost Bolívar Department, in Santander, Boyacá and the northern part of Cundinamarca. Well known fossiliferous outcrops of the formation occur near Villa de Leyva, also written as Villa de Leiva, and neighboring Sáchica.

The formation was named after Quebrada La Paja in Betulia, Santander, and stretches across  from northeast to southwest. The Paja Formation overlies the Ritoque and Rosablanca Formations and is overlain by the San Gil Group and the Simití and Tablazo Formations and dates from the late Hauterivian to late Aptian. The Paja Formation comprises mudstones, shales and nodules of sandstones and limestones, deposited in an anoxic environment, in the warm and shallow sea that covered large parts of the present Colombian territory during the Cretaceous.

Initially considered to host Colombian emeralds, the emerald-bearing part was redefined as a separate formation; the Muzo Formation. The Paja Formation Lagerstätte is famous for its vertebrate fossils and is the richest Mesozoic fossiliferous formation of Colombia. Several marine reptile fossils of plesiosaurs, pliosaurs, ichthyosauras and turtles have been described from the formation and it hosts the only dinosaur fossils described in the country to date; Padillasaurus. The formation also has provided many ammonites, fossil flora, decapods and the fossil shark Protolamna ricaurtei.

Description 
The Paja Formation was first described by O.C. Wheeler, according to Morales (1958), and named after Quebrada La Paja, a tributary of the Sogamoso River. The type section is exposed on the northern banks of the quebrada at the confluence of the Sogamoso River in Betulia, Santander.

The formation is divided into the Lutitas Negras Inferiores, Arcillolitas Abigarradas and Arcillolitas con Nódulos Huecos Members, and stretches across  from northeast to southwest. The Paja Formation overlies the Ritoque and Rosablanca Formations and is overlain by the Simití and Tablazo Formations and dates from the Hauterivian to Late Aptian.

Outcrops 

Outcrops of the formation extend from Simití in the north, close to the border of Santander and Bolívar, where the formation is offset by the Simití Fault, to the Pauna Anticlinal in San Pablo de Borbur, where the formation is thrusted over the Ritoque Formation in the south. In the southern extension of the exposures, the formation crops out in the north of Tununguá, near the Ibacapí Fault.

Santander
In the Middle Magdalena Valley, south of Barrancabermeja, the Paja Formation in the subsurface is offset by the Casabe, Infantas and Arruga Faults. In the northeastern extent, in Río Negro, near the border with Norte de Santander, the formation is found in the subsurface, offset by the Lebríja Fault. The town center of Zapatoca rests on the formation in the synclinal named after the village. The Paja Formation also crops out in the northwestern part of the Middle Magdalena Valley, east of San Pablo, Bolívar, where in the formation underlies the Simití Formation and is offset in the subsurface by the Pozo Azul and Caña Braval Faults. South of there, the Paja Formation is offset by the La Corcovada and El Guineal Faults, and the regional La Salina Fault. Near the eponymous town, the formation is offset by the Landazurí Fault.

West of Barichara, the formation underlies the corregimiento  and is found in the hills bordering both sides of the Suárez River. In this area, the Paja Formation is offset by the Suárez Fault. Surrounding Jordán, Santander, the formation crops out on both sides of the Chicamocha River in the Chicamocha Canyon. The touristic town San Gil rests on the formation and the Fonce River cuts into it. East of the town center, the formation is offset by the Curití and Ocamonte Faults. The urban centers of Oiba, San Benito, Encino, Ocamonte and Charalá are built on top of the Paja Formation. In this area, the formation is offset by the Confines and Encino Faults. Further to the south, the towns of Vélez, Guavatá and Jesús María rest on the formation. West of the latter, the Paja Formation is put in a reverse faulted contact with the Cumbre Formation. The El Carmen Fault puts the Paja Formation in contact with the Jurassic Girón Formation.

Boyacá

In northeastern Boyacá, the formation underlies the urban center of Moniquirá (not to be confused with Monquirá, a vereda of nearby Villa de Leyva) and is crossed by the Moniquirá River. West of Arcabuco in the Villa de Leyva Synclinal, the formation is cut by the Arcabuco River. In the vicinity of Pauna and San Pablo de Borbur, the formation crops out in an extensive area. Here, the Paja Formation is offset by the Río Minero and Pedro Gómez Faults and occurs in the footwall of the La Venta Fault. North of Lake Fúquene, the town centers of Tinjacá and Sutamarchán are built on top of the Paja Formation. In this area, the formation extends into the northern part of Cundinamarca, where the urban centers of Yacopí and La Palma rest on the formation.

Villa de Leyva 
Surrounding the touristic town of Villa de Leyva, the formation crops out in the hills in a microclimatic location, known as the La Candelaria Desert, stretching across Villa de Leyva, Santa Sofía and Sáchica. In the vicinity of Villa de Leyva, the formation has provided many fossils of marine reptiles, as well as the dinosaur Padillasaurus.

Stratigraphy 

The Paja Formation overlies the Ritoque and Rosablanca Formations and is concordantly overlain by the San Gil Group and Tablazo Formations in the eastern extent, and the Simití Formation in the northwestern Middle Magdalena Valley. In the Western emerald belt, the contact with the Rosablanca Formation is concordant and abrupt.

Members
The Paja Formation is subdivided into three members, from oldest to youngest:

The age of this member is estimated at late Hauterivian, based on ammonites analyzed by Fernando Etayo.
In the upper  of this member, intercalations of gypsum occur. The age of the middle member of the Paja Formation is estimated at early Barremian to late Aptian on the basis of ammonites described by Fernando Etayo.
Ammonite analysis has led to an estimated late Aptian age for the member.

In the northern part of the Middle Magdalena Valley, the Paja Formation comprises dark grey to blueish shales, intercalated with grey to yellowish fine-grained sandstones and fossiliferous limestones, locally with a sandy component. Bürgl in 1954 reported beds of tuff in the Paja Formation near Villa de Leyva. Thin section analysis of samples of the Paja Formation has provided insight in the micritic components of the sediments, where three microfacies were recognized; biomicritic wackestones, foraminiferous packstones and sandy biomicritic floatstones containing fragments of echinoderms, bivalves, crinoids and gastropods cemented by hematite.

The Paja Formation correlates with the Tibasosa Formation to the east on the northern Altiplano Cundiboyacense in Boyacá and with the El Peñón Formation pertaining to the Villeta Group to the south in the Eastern Ranges. The formation is laterally equivalent with the black shales of the Fómeque Formation in the eastern part of the Eastern Ranges and the sandstones of Las Juntas Formation in the Sierra Nevada del Cocuy. In the Middle Magdalena Valley to the west, the formation partly overlies and partly is laterally equivalent to the limestones of the Rosablanca Formation. The Paja Formation is diachronous with the Ritoque and Rosablanca Formations. To the northeast of the extent of the formation, it correlates with the upper part of the Río Negro Formation, and the lowermost Tibú-Mercedes Formation of the Catatumbo Basin.

Paleogeography 

During deposition of the Paja Formation, the paleo coastline was oriented west-east.

From the late Aptian to early Albian, the area was covered by an extensive carbonate platform, in the extent of the Paja Formation represented by the San Gil Group, Tablazo Formation and Villeta Group.

Depositional environment 
The thin section analysis led to the interpretation of a shoreface to lower shoreface environment, in the internal parts of a carbonate platform, where transgressions and regressions caused the variations in grain sizes and lithologies. The Barremian to Aptian sequence shows evidence of an overall relative sea level fall with open marine sedimentation in the lowest member and tidal deposits in the upper part of the formation.

One of the longest anoxic intervals of geologic history occurred during the Cretaceous, from about 125 to 80 Ma (early Aptian to early Campanian). During this Oceanic Anoxic Event, there were two spikes, the Selli event, dating to the early Aptian (approximately 120 Ma) was active during deposition of the black shales of the Paja Formation. The formation contains three spikes of δ13C, with values above 1.5‰, in the lower, middle to upper and upper Paja Formation. These spikes indicate a global change in the carbon cycle and the preservation of organic matter due to poor oxygenation of sea waters. The cause of these elevated δ13C levels may have been a global increase in volcanic activity.

Mining and petroleum geology 

The Paja Formation is one of the stratigraphic units cropping out in the Western emerald belt. Mineralization in the formation has been dated on the basis of 40Ar/39Ar analysis of muscovite minerals. In western San Pablo de Borbur, Boyacá, the mineralization dates to the Late Eocene at 36.4 ± 0.1 and 37.3 ± 0.1 Ma. In the northwestern part of Muzo, Boyacá, mineralization happened during the Early Oligocene, at 31.4 ± 0.3 Ma. Previous geologic researchers considered the Paja Formation hosted emeralds, and later definition of the stratigraphy of Colombia separated one of the main emerald formations of Colombia as the contemporaneous Barremian Muzo Formation, providing emeralds in the La Pita mine and important Coscuéz mine.

The Paja Formation is known for its gypsum deposits, which are mined and restricted to Santander. Near Guavatá, the formation hosts sphalerite and malachite and near Otanche, pyrite and galena are found in the formation. In Gámbita, the Paja Formation contains pyrite, galena and chalcopyrite. Other minerals occurring in the Paja Formation, are lead and zinc, around Paime and Yacopí, Cundinamarca.

The Paja Formation is considered a minor source rock in the Eastern Cordillera Basin and the Middle Magdalena Valley, with seal capacity for the underlying Rosablanca Formation reservoir in the latter basin. Vitrinite reflectance analysis on samples of the Paja Formation indicate an average value of 0.52 Ro, making the formation a marginal source rock.

Paleontological significance 

The Paja Formation is the richest Mesozoic fossiliferous formation of Colombia. Fauna of dinosaurs, Padillasaurus, and various marine reptiles, among which plesiosaurs, ichthyosaurs, pliosaurs and turtles make up the vertebrate assemblage. Furthermore, many ammonites, the foraminifer Epistomina, decapods, flora and fossil fish have been recovered from the formation. Paja ammonites have been used in the walls and floor of the  near Villa de Leyva.

In 2019, turtle expert Edwin Cadena described a fossil of Desmatochelys padillai who was found with her eggs still inside her.

Within the Arcillolitas Abigarradas Member of the Paja Formation, some horizons preserve abundant wood, which is frequently bored by pseudoplanktonic pholadoid bivalves, commonly referred to as "shipworms" or "piddocks". The presence of wood boring bivalves in Paja Formation seas indicates the continued presence of xylic substrates, and long residence time of floating wood.

IUGS geological heritage site
In respect of the 'world's most complete record of Lower Cretaceous marine reptiles and associated fauna', the International Union of Geological Sciences (IUGS) included the 'Marine Reptile Lagerstätte from the Lower Cretaceous of the Ricaurte Alto' in its assemblage of 100 'geological heritage sites' around the world in a listing published in October 2022. The organisation defines an IUGS Geological Heritage Site as 'a key place with geological elements and/or processes of international scientific relevance, used as a reference, and/or with a substantial contribution to the development of geological sciences through history.'

Fossil content

Reptiles

Ammonites

Crustaceans

Flora

Fish 
 Protolamna ricaurtei

Ichnofossils 
 Teredolites clavatus

Regional correlations

Panorama

See also 

 Plesiosaur stratigraphic distribution
 Floresta Formation, Devonian fossiliferous formation of the Altiplano Cundiboyacense
 Cerrejón Formation, Paleocene fossiliferous formation of northeastern Colombia
 Honda Group, Miocene Lagerstätte of the Upper Magdalena Valley
 La Amarga Formation, contemporaneous fossiliferous formation of the Neuquén Basin in Argentina
 Cerro Barcino Formation, contemporaneous fossiliferous formation of the Cañadón Asfalto Basin in Argentina
 Río Belgrano Formation, contemporaneous fossiliferous formation of the Austral Basin in Argentina
 Camarillas Formation, contemporaneous fossiliferous formation of the Galve Basin in Spain

Notes

References

Bibliography 
Geology
 
 
 
 
 
 
 
 
 
 
 
 
 
 
 
 

Paleontology

Maps

External links 

  Leyvachelys cipadi, una nueva especie de tortuga sandownidae del Cretácico inferior de Colombia
  Brachauchenius, un superpredador de los mares cretácicos

 
Geologic formations of Colombia
Cretaceous Colombia
Shale formations
Shallow marine deposits
Evaporite deposits
Source rock formations
Seal rock formations
Cretaceous paleontological sites of South America
Mining in Colombia
Formations
Formations
Formations
Formations
Formations
First 100 IUGS Geological Heritage Sites